Miss Earth Liberia is the official title given to Liberia's delegate to the Miss Earth pageant. The pageant focuses mainly on promoting environmental causes and winners are chosen equally on their physical attributes as well as their understanding and knowledge of the issues affecting the earth.

History 
In 2005, the Miss Earth Liberia franchise was obtained by Beauties of Africa Inc, owned by Mr. Andy A. Abulime. However, the first year Liberia sent a representative to Miss Earth was in 2006 with Rachel Bidmia Njinimbam as the first Miss Earth Liberia titleholder and competed in Miss Earth 2006.

In 2008, Liberia was represented in Miss Earth 2008 by Marit Woods, the daughter of Samuel Kofi Woods, a lifelong Liberian Human Rights Advocate and also Liberia’s Labor Ministry.

In 2018, Wokie Dolo, former Miss World Liberia 2017 and owner of La Queen Entertainment serves as the national director. The pageant was formed in partnership with The Environmental Protection Agency (EPA); winner automatically becomes the ambassador of the EPA.

The 2020 pageant was slated to be held on 28 March 2020, but postponed in September due to the COVID-19 pandemic.

In September 2020, the President of Liberia, George Weah congratulated the winners of Miss Earth Liberia 2020 for promoting the country's tourism industry as part of the United Nations World Tourism Organization's World Tourism Day. The Liberian President also recorded a song, “Da who will win” dedicated to the contestants of Miss Earth Liberia pageant.

Titleholders
The following are the names of the annual titleholders of Miss Earth Liberia, listed according to the year in which they participated in Miss Earth:

See also
Miss Earth

Miss Liberia

References

External links

Liberia
Beauty pageants in Liberia
Liberian awards